James E. Freeman (February 2, 1946 – August 9, 2014) was an American actor and poet.

He was often cast in menacing roles, such as the evil mobster Marcello Santos in David Lynch's Wild at Heart (1990), the terrifying henchman Eddie "the Dane" in the Coens' Miller's Crossing (1990), and the cruel scientist Dr. Mason Wren in Jean-Pierre Jeunet's Alien Resurrection (1997).

Acting career
Freeman trained as an actor with Jean Shelton at Shelton Studios in the San Francisco area in the 1970s. He was nominated for best actor for playing Teach in the West Coast premiere of David Mamet's American Buffalo, which also featured George Eckel and Charles Bouvier. After directing Look Back in Anger in 1979, Freeman moved to Los Angeles to pursue a film career. His first movie appearance was in the action film An Eye for an Eye (1981) in which he played a tow-truck driver who exchanges words with Chuck Norris. Other notable films in which he played include Ruthless People (1986) as the "Bedroom Killer", Patriot Games (1992) as the bearded CIA agent Marty Cantor, Copycat (1995) as the police lieutenant Thomas Quinn, and Go (1998) as  strip-club owner Vic Sr.

He retired from acting in 2007.

Personal life
James E. Freeman attended Bishop Loughlin Memorial High School in Brooklyn, New York. He was a three-year member of the track team. He graduated from Bishop Loughlin in 1964. As a high school student, he was assertively conservative.

He was gay. At age 22, he revealed his sexuality to the United States Marine Corps, leading to his discharge. He had been HIV-positive since around 1984. In 2009, he published a letter to the editor on sfgate.com, describing his reminiscences of the 1969 Stonewall Riots.<ref name=SFGate>"Letters to datebook". sfgate.com, June 26, 2009.</ref>

He wrote poetry and had a tumblr blog ("Freedapoet") dedicated to his work.

Death
Freeman died in the evening of August 9, 2014, of AIDS. He was 68.

Filmography

1981: An Eye for an Eye - Tow Truck Dude
1983: Twice Upon a Time - Rusher of Din - Pool Player
1986: Stingray (1x01 - Ancient Eyes)
1986: Ruthless People - The Bedroom Killer
1986: Hard Traveling - Ed Sloan
1988: Terrorist on Trial: The United States vs. Salim Ajami (TV Movie) - Agent Peter Nello
1988: The Couch Trip - Unger
1990: Wild at Heart - Marcellus Santos
1990: Miller's Crossing - Eddie Dane
1991: One Good Cop - Captain Schreiber
1991: The Doctor - Ralph
1991: Aces: Iron Eagle III - Ames
1992: Memphis (TV Movie) - Podjo Harris
1992: Patriot Games - Marty Cantor
1992: Highlander: The Series - Joe Scanlon (1x02 - Family Tree)
1993: Casualties of Love: The Long Island Lolita Story - Marty Algar
1993: Mother's Boys - Everett, Principal
1994: It Could Happen to You - Sal Bontempo
1994: There Goes My Baby - George
1995: Copycat - Thomas Quinn
1997: Dream with the Fishes - Joe, Nick's father
1997: Alien Resurrection - Dr. Mason Wren
1997: The Man Who Knew Too Little - CIA Man
1998: Dance with Me - (uncredited)
1998: Fool's Gold - George
1999: Go - Victor Sr.
2000: Auggie Rose - Pawn Shop Owner
2000: Skeleton Woman - Luigi
2000: Along for the Ride - Jake Cowens
2001: Suspended Animation - Philip Boulette
2003: Carolina - Wrecking Yard Owner
2003: 44 Minutes: The North Hollywood Shoot-Out (TV Movie) - Police commander
2003: Mystery Woman (TV Movie) - Ian Philby
2004: Tremors 4: The Legend Begins'' (Video) - Old Fred

References

External links
 

1946 births
2014 deaths
American male film actors
People from Brooklyn
Male actors from New York City
LGBT people from New York (state)
American gay actors
AIDS-related deaths in California
Bishop Loughlin Memorial High School alumni